Moyen-Ogooué is one of Gabon's nine provinces. The provincial capital is Lambaréné. As of 2013, 69,287 people lived there.

Unlike any other province of Gabon, Moyen-Ogooué has neither seacoast nor a foreign border. It borders the following provinces:

Estuaire Province – northwest
Woleu-Ntem Province – north-northeast
Ogooué-Ivindo Province – east
Ogooué-Lolo Province – southeast, at a quadripoint
Ngounié Province – south
Ogooué-Maritime Province – west-southwest

Moyen-Ogooué borders all but two of the rest of Gabon's provinces, thus more than any other province.

Departments

Moyen-Ogooué is divided into 2 departments:
Abanga-Bigne Department (capital Ndjolé)
Ogooué et des Lacs Department (capital Lambaréné)

References

Further reading
 Petringa, Maria. Brazza, A Life for Africa. Bloomington, IN: AuthorHouse, 2006. .  Describes Pierre Savorgnan de Brazza's extensive explorations of the Ogoué River basin.

 
Provinces of Gabon